Deh Molla (also Romanized as Deh Mollā; also known as Mollā) is a village in Chahar Cheshmeh Rural District, Kamareh District, Khomeyn County, Markazi Province, Iran. At the 2006 census, its population was 15, in 5 families.

References 

Populated places in Khomeyn County